Middle is one of the six sheadings of the Isle of Man.

It is located on the east of the island (part of the traditional South Side division) and consists of the four historic parishes of Braddan, Marown, Onchan and Santon. Historically, from 1796 until 1986 Marown was in the sheading of Glenfaba, and before 1796 Onchan was in the sheading of Garff.

In addition to the current districts listed above, the sheading of Middle also includes the borough of Douglas, the capital and largest town of the Isle of Man.

Other settlements in the sheading include Port Soderick, Strang, Tromode and Union Mills (all in the parish of Braddan), Braaid, Crosby and Glen Vine (all in the parish of Marown), and Newtown in the parish of Santon.

MHKs & Elections
It is also a House of Keys constituency. Originally, in the 19th century, the constituency included the whole of the sheading (excluding Douglas), and elected 3 members. In the more recent period up to 2011 it elected one MHK, but the constituency excluded Santan, which was in the Malew & Santon constituency. In 2016 the constituency included Santan, and elected two MHKs.

This information is incomplete.

See also
Local government in the Isle of Man

References

External links
Constituency maps and general election results

Sheadings of the Isle of Man
Constituencies of the Isle of Man